"Sweet Mary" is  a song written by Steve Jablecki and performed by Wadsworth Mansion. "Sweet Mary" was featured on their 1971 album Wadsworth Mansion and was produced by Jim Calvert and Norman Marzano.

Chart performance
"Sweet Mary" reached #7 on the U.S. pop chart and #35 on the U.S. adult contemporary chart in 1971.  In Canada, the song reached #5.

It ranked #96 on Billboard magazine's Top 100 singles of 1971.

Chart history

Weekly charts

Year-end charts

References

1970 songs
1970 debut singles
Sussex Records singles